"You’re Driving Me Crazy" is an American popular song composed (music and lyrics) by Walter Donaldson in 1930 and recorded the same year by Lee Morse, Rudy Vallée & His Connecticut Yankees and Guy Lombardo & His Royal Canadians (with vocal by Carmen Lombardo).

Successful recordings

The song became a hit and was added to the 1930 musical comedy Smiles, starring Marilyn Miller and Fred and Adele Astaire.  It was recorded in 1930 by McKinney's Cotton Pickers and by Nick Lucas & His Crooning Troubadors. Nick Lucas's version, released on Brunswick, was a No. 7 hit: Brunswick 4987 (E-35404).  Other popular artists issuing recording of this hit that same year included Rudy Vallée, Gene Austin  and Guy Lombardo. 
The chords of "You're Driving Me Crazy" form the basis for Bennie Moten's great "Moten Swing."

In 1931, cartoon character Betty Boop sang a sexy version of the song in the pre-code cartoon Silly Scandals.  As Boop sang the song, her dress slipped down repeatedly, revealing a  lacy bra and causing her to squeal. Later in the song, Betty was joined on stage by a line of mechanical dancing penguins who stomped out the beat in accompaniment to her singing.

"You're Driving Me Crazy" has become a standard that has been recorded by over 100 artists. The artists who have recorded the song include 
Louis Armstrong,  Chet Baker,    Betty Carter,  Ella Fitzgerald, Billie Holiday,   Peggy Lee, Della Reese, Django Reinhardt,  Dinah Shore,  Frank Sinatra,  Mel Tormé, Sarah Vaughan,  and Lester Young. A version by The Temperance Seven made number one in the UK Singles chart in 1961.

The song has also been performed in the movies including:

  Your'e Driving Me Crazy (misplaced apostrophe in the original screen title), a Fleischer Studios 1931 cartoon  in the Screen Songs series , with jazzy scat singing of "You're Driving Me Crazy" by various animals. There is a dancing lion, monkeys and other animals, including a Cab Calloway sound-alike. It features singer Harriet Lee in a "follow the bouncing ball" sing along segment. 
 The 1931 Paramount Betty Boop cartoon Silly Scandals noted above.
 The 1991 film The Marrying Man starring Kim Basinger and Alec Baldwin.  "You're Driving Me Crazy" is performed by Alan Paul from Manhattan Transfer.
 The 2005 Oscar-nominated film Good Night, and Good Luck.  "You're Driving Me Crazy" and other standards performed by Dianne Reeves.
 The 2001 soccer/prison movie Mean Machine. "You're Driving Me Crazy" is performed by Bob Brozman on a soundtrack.

The Temperance Seven cover version
A cover version by The Temperance Seven, described as an art school band "who were retro before most of pop was even original," was produced by George Martin. It was recorded in 1961, reaching number 1 on the UK Singles Chart that May. Their version is a pastiche on the original, and on 1920s dance band music in general, with Paul McDowell's insincere "whispering" helping to highlight this. Music critic Tom Ewing, writing for Freaky Trigger, concurrently described it as "one of the strangest number ones," "one of the most prescient [number ones]" and "the first meta-pop hit", citing the song's "deliberate, tongue-in-cheek commentary on pop via pop, the world of the dance orchestras pushed flippantly into the TV age," feeling this anticipated Roxy Music and Richard X, but also feeling as many people would have bought the single based on nostalgia as those who bought it due to its cleverness.

Notable recorded versions

Lorez Alexandria
Steve Allen
Gene Ammons
Ray Anthony
Louis Armstrong
Gene Austin
Chet Baker
Josephine Baker
Betty Bennett
Ruby Braff
Les Brown
Bob Brozman
Sonny Burke
Max Bygraves
Barbara Carroll
Betty Carter
The Catalinas
Charlie & His Orchestra
Nat King Cole
Ken Colyer
Eddie Condon
Bob Crosby
Bing Crosby (for his 1957 album New Tricks.)
Doris Day
Joey Dee and the Starliters
Vic Dickenson
Tommy Dorsey
Billy Eckstine
Kurt Edelhagen
Les Elgart
Anita Ellis
Seger Ellis
Bill Evans
Al Fairweather
Georgie Fame
Gracie Fields
Ella Fitzgerald
Erroll Garner
Jackie Gleason
Benny Goodman
Stéphane Grappelli
Buddy Greco (1953)
Parry Gripp
Lionel Hampton
Dick Haymes
Jeff Healey
Ted Heath
Fletcher Henderson
Earl Hines
Art Hodes
Johnny Hodges
Billie Holiday
Hoosier Hot Shots
Claude Hopkins
Helen Humes
Dick Hyman
Etta Jones
Clifford Jordan
Ben E. King
Lee Konitz
Abbe Lane
Peggy Lee
Guy Lombardo
Nick Lucas
Humphrey Lyttelton
Billy May
Les McCann
Jack McDuff
The McGuire Sisters
Dave McKenna
McKinney's Cotton Pickers
Jay McShann
George Melly
Glenn Miller
Mistinguett
Joe Morello
Jaye P. Morgan
Lee Morse
Joe Pass
Tony Pastor
Bob and Alf Pearson
Art Pepper
Perez Prado
Professor Longhair
Quintet of the Hot Club of France
Sonny Red
Don Redman & His Orchestra (1939)
Della Reese
Dianne Reeves
Django Reinhardt (21 April 1937)
Line Renaud (1965) (in French)
Nelson Riddle
Tito Rodriguez
Jimmy Rowles
Jane Russell
George Shearing
Lennington Shewell
Dinah Shore
Zoot Sims
Frank Sinatra
Keely Smith
Valaida Snow
Jeri Southern
Muggsy Spanier
Squirrel Nut Zippers (1995)
Jess Stacy
Kay Starr
Curtis Stigers
Maxine Sullivan
Art Tatum
The Temperance Seven (1961)
Mel Tormé
Big Joe Turner
Rudy Vallée
Sarah Vaughan
Fred Waring
Teddy Wilson
Phil Woods
Lester Young

References

External links
 A useful list of links to many of the recordings mentioned above
 Vivian Buczek performing an excerpt
 
 

Songs with music by Walter Donaldson
Pop standards
1961 singles
UK Singles Chart number-one singles
1930 songs
1930 singles
Guy Lombardo songs